The Scottish Senior Open is a men's professional golf tournament for players aged 50 and above which is part of the European Senior Tour. It was founded in 1993. The 2018 event was held at Craigielaw Golf Club, Longniddry, Scotland.

Winners

External links
Coverage on the European Senior Tour's official site

European Senior Tour events
Golf tournaments in Scotland
Sport in East Lothian
Sport in Fife
Sports competitions in Edinburgh
Sport in the Scottish Borders
Sports competitions in Aberdeen
Annual sporting events in the United Kingdom
Recurring sporting events established in 1993
1993 establishments in Scotland